Atanasio de la Cruz Aguirre (2 June 1801 – 28 September 1875) was acting President of Uruguay from 1864 to 1865.

Background

Aguirre was a member of the National Party. He served as the President of the Chamber of Deputies of Uruguay in 1853. He was a Senator from 1861.

On March 1, 1864, Bernardo Berro stepped down from the Presidency.

President of Uruguay

He assumed the Presidency of Uruguay as next-in-line, in his capacity of President of the Senate of Uruguay. This lasted until February 1865.

During the Paraguayan War, Francisco Solano López had sought to send an army to aid Aguirre against Venancio Flores, who was supported by Brazilian troops.

With Montevideo under siege, Atanasio de la Cruz Aguirre stepped down from the Presidency in favour of Senator Tomás Villalba, who soon made peace with the Colorado Party besiegers, allied with Brazil.

This transition of power marked the coming to Presidential office of heads of state of the Colorado Party, which then remained in office for nearly a century.

See also
 Politics of Uruguay

References

 :es:Atanasio Cruz Aguirre

1801 births
1875 deaths
Presidents of Uruguay
Presidents of the Senate of Uruguay
Uruguayan people of Basque descent
National Party (Uruguay) politicians
Presidents of the Chamber of Representatives of Uruguay